Because of You is the second studio album by American singer and songwriter Ne-Yo. It was released by Compound Entertainment and Def Jam Recordings on April 25, 2007 in the United States. Ne-Yo reteamed with many previous collaborators to work on the follow-up to his debut album In My Own Words (2006), involving Ron "Neff-U" Feemster, StarGate, and Shea Taylor, as well as new and upcoming musicians such as The Heavyweights, Eric Hudson, Timothy Bloom, Knobody, and Syience. Next to them, Because of You features guest vocal contributions from rapper Jay-Z on "Crazy" and fellow R&B singer Jennifer Hudson on "Leaving Tonight".

Because of You debuted at number one on the US Billboard 200 and Top R&B/Hip-Hop Albums charts, selling over 250,000 copies in its first week, and was later certified platinum by the Recording Industry Association of America (RIAA). It also reached the top ten in Canada and the United Kingdom but was commercially less successful than In My Own Words elsewhere. Released to generally positive reviews from most music critics, who complimented the album for the advancement over its predecessor, it won the Grammy Award for Best Contemporary R&B Album at the 50th Annual Grammy Awards in February 2008.

Critical reception 

At Metacritic, which assigns a normalized rating out of 100 to reviews from critics, the album received an average score of 74, which indicates "generally favorable" reviews, based on 14 critics. PopMatterss Colin McGuire found that with Because of You Ne-Yo "relishes in his disgust for a sophomore slump by fighting back with an album that leaves his first solo effort so far in the dust". He felt that the album "might end up being the best R&B album of the year." Similarly, AllMusic editor Andy Kellman noted that "the key to the album's potency and freshness is its differences from In My Own Words [...] Making it to number one on your own, writing a major hit for one of the planet's most popular entertainers, and qualifying as the heir to R. Kelly can have that effect."

In his review for The A.V. Club, Nathan Rabin wrote that the album "is a real sleeper that reveals considerable strengths upon repeat listens [...] Best of all, with a running time of just over 59 minutes, Because of You is largely devoid of filler, and it never threatens to wear out its welcome." Simon Vozick-Levinson from Entertainment Weekly noted that "indeed, the album is an unmistakable attempt to channel Michael Jackson's early work such as Off the Wall [...] and the effort often pays off beautifully [...] Ne-Yo's lithe falsetto puts the many others who've been labeled Jackson-esque to shame." Slant Magazine also compared the album's sensual ballads to Janet Jackson. Kelefa Sanneh, writer for The New York Times, found that Ne-Yo "got a silky voice and a clear knack for chronicling obsessive love and lust; maybe one day he’ll create a half-crazed R&B masterpiece. But in the meantime, Because of You is a likable little album: 12 girl-crazy songs from a boy who can stop anytime he wants. Honest."

Commercial performance
Because of You debuted at number one on the Billboard 200 and Billboard R&B/Hip-Hop Albums, selling 251,000 copies on its first week of release. Because of You is Ne-Yo's second number-one album. The album has shipped one million units in the US. It has sold over 1,630,000 copies in the United States alone. It spawned four singles: "Because Of You", "Do You", "Can We Chill", and "Go On Girl". "Leaving Tonight" was released as a radio single.

Track listing 

Notes
 signifies a co-producer
"Leaving Tonight" contains elements of "Baby Come Close" written by Smokey Robinson, Marvin Tarplin, Pamela Moffett-Young, and performed by Smokey Robinson.

Personnel
Credits adapted from album's liner notes.

Marcus Allen – producer (track 4)
David Barnett – viola (tracks 4, 11)
Timothy "Keys" Bloom – producer (track 11)
Jeff Chestek – engineer (track 4)
Tom Coyne – mastering
Joe Davi – guitar and bass (track 6)
Kevin "KD" Davis – mixing (tracks 2–11)
Andrew Dawson – engineer (track 9)
Mikkel S. Eriksen – producer, engineer, and all instruments (tracks 1, 12)
Ron "Neff-U” Feemstar – producer (track 2)
Larry Gold – string arrangement and production (tracks 4, 11)
Jaymz Hardy-Martin III – engineer (tracks 4, 11)
Tor Erik Hermansen – producer and all instruments (tracks 1, 12)
Ricardo "Slick" Hinkson – assistant engineer (tracks 4, 7, 10, 11)
Bob Horn – engineer (track 2)
Josh Houghkirk – assistant mixing engineer (tracks 1, 12)
Eric Hudson – producer and all instruments (tracks 3, 7)
Jennifer Hudson – vocals (track 6)
Jay-Z – rap (track 2)
Gloria Justen – violin (tracks 4, 11)
Knobody – producer (track 6)
Olga Konopelsky – violin (tracks 4, 11)
Emma Kummrow – violin (tracks 4, 11)
Danielle Laport – additional recording (track 10)
Espen Lind – guitar (track 12)
Jennie Lorenzo – cello (tracks 4, 11)
Ne-Yo – vocals (all tracks), co–producer (tracks 1, 3–12)
Deepu Panjwani – assistant engineer (tracks 4, 7, 10, 11)
Syience – producer (track 9)
Melvin Sparkman – producer (track 4)
Brian Springer – engineer (track 9)
Brian Sumner – engineer (track 3)
Igor Szwec – violin (tracks 4, 11)
Phil Tan – mixing (tracks 1, 12)
Shea Taylor – producer and guitar (tracks 5, 8, 10), saxophone and horns (track 5)
Michael Tocci – engineer (all tracks)
Shane "Bermuda" Woodley – assistant mixing engineer (tracks 2–11), engineer (tracks 3, 7)

Charts

Weekly charts

Year-end charts

Certifications

Release history

References

External links 
 Because of You at Discogs
 Album review at IGN
 

2007 albums
Ne-Yo albums
Albums produced by Ne-Yo
Albums produced by Eric Hudson
Albums produced by Jay-Z
Albums produced by Stargate
Albums produced by Theron Feemster
Def Jam Recordings albums
Grammy Award for Best Contemporary R&B Album